João Diogo Marques Paredes (born 1 January 1996) is a Portuguese professional footballer who plays for Feirense as a forward.

Club career
On 28 June 2022, Paredes signed with Feirense.

References

External links

1996 births
People from Figueira da Foz
Sportspeople from Coimbra District
Living people
Portuguese footballers
Association football forwards
Anadia F.C. players
F.C. Vizela players
G.D. Chaves players
C.D. Mafra players
C.D. Trofense players
U.D. Leiria players
U.D. Oliveirense players
C.D. Feirense players
Segunda Divisão players
Liga Portugal 2 players
Campeonato de Portugal (league) players